The Fin-de-Siècle Museum ("Museum of the Turn of the Century") is a museum in Brussels, Belgium. It is dedicated to the full spectrum of the arts of the period between 1884, when the Société Libre des Beaux-Arts ("Free Society of Fine Arts") was founded Brussels, and 1914, the year of the outbreak of World War I. It is one of the constituent museums of the Royal Museums of Fine Arts of Belgium. The museum opened on 6 December 2013.

Collection
Artists represented in the museum's collection include Constantin Meunier, James Ensor, Henri Evenepoel, Fernand Khnopff, and Léon Spilliaert. The museum also celebrates the richness of the period in literature, architecture, photography, opera, music, and poetry, featuring works by Maurice Maeterlinck, Emile Verhaeren, Octave Maus, Victor Horta, Henry Van de Velde, Maurice Kufferath, and Guillaume Lekeu. 

Important international artists of the period in the collection include Vincent van Gogh, Auguste Rodin, Georges Seurat, Paul Gauguin, and Edward Burne-Jones. The Gillon-Crowet gallery houses a collection of Art Nouveau furniture and decorative arts.

See also
 Art Nouveau in Brussels
 History of Brussels
 Culture of Belgium
 Belgium in "the long nineteenth century"

References

Notes

External links

 Musée Fin-de-Siècle Museum official website

Museums in Brussels
City of Brussels
Art museums and galleries in Belgium